The Obligatory Contour Principle (frequently abbreviated OCP) is a hypothesis in autosegmental phonology that states that (certain) consecutive identical features are banned in underlying representations. The OCP is most frequently cited when discussing the tones of tonal languages (stating for example that the same morpheme may not have two underlying high tones), but it has also been applied to other aspects of phonology.

Background considerations

A commonly held conception within phonology is that no morpheme is allowed to contain two consecutive high tones. If two consecutive high tones appear within a single morpheme, then some rule must have applied . Maybe one of the surface high-tone vowels was underlyingly high-toned, while the other was underlyingly toneless. Then, since all vowels must have tone at the surface (in this hypothetical language), the high tone of the one vowel spreads onto the other (see: autosegmental phonology). Alternatively, one (or both) of the vowels may have started out low-toned and become high-toned due to the application of some rule; or perhaps there was a low tone between the two high tones that got deleted at some point. Regardless, the OCP claims that there can not have been two consecutive high tones (nor two consecutive low tones, etc.) in the underlying representation of the morpheme, i.e. in the morpheme's lexical entry.

History

In autosegmental phonology , with articulated conceptions about associations between featural melodies and skeletal units (i.e. However, there was also a strong opposition to the OCP as a formal constraint in phonological theory, headed by David Odden.  showed that, contrary to the contemporaneous assumption that constraints were inviolable, an examination of African tonal systems reveals many apparent surface violations of the OCP. A lively debate continued between John McCarthy and David Odden for several years, with each adding an extra 'anti-' to the title of the previous article of the other - e.g.

Debate

In Optimality Theory (OT), the OCP has been again redefined as a violable constraint. Yet many issues as to its precise formal character remain: (i) locality - what is the domain of the OCP (i.e. strict adjacency? etc.) and how is the domain represented in the theory; (ii) near-identical sequences - many languages show an OCP-like resistance to sequences of segments that differ in just one distinctive feature; is this the effect of the OCP, some other constraint? If the latter, how is this constraint formally related to the OCP; (iii) status as an OT constraint - is the OCP a single constraint, or is it the local self-conjunction of markedness constraints (Alderete 1997)?  These and other issues related to the OCP continue to be hotly debated in phonological theory.

Meeussen's Rule
A particular instance of the OCP is Meeussen's Rule , named after the Belgian Bantu specialist A. E. Meeussen, which has been used to explain how a sequence HH tones becomes HL in various Bantu languages.

References 

 .
 .
 . PhD dissertation, MIT.
 . In Aronoff, M. & Oehrle, R (eds.), Language Sound Structure, Cambridge, Massachusetts, MIT.
 . Scanned 2MB Searchable 5MB
 
 . PhD dissertation, MIT. Distributed by Indiana University Linguistics Club.
 . PhD dissertation, MIT.
 .
 .
 .
 .
 .
 . PhD dissertation, MIT.
 .

External links

Obligatory Contour Principle
Inherent variability and the obligatory contour principle
IDEALS Obligatory contour principle effects and violations: The case of Setswana verbal tone

Phonology